A visor (also spelled vizor) is a surface that protects the eyes, such as shading them from the sun or other bright light or protecting them from objects.

Nowadays many visors are transparent, but before strong transparent substances such as polycarbonate were invented, visors were opaque like a mask
The part of a helmet in a suit of armor that protects the eyes.
A type of headgear consisting only of a visor and a band as a way to fasten it around the head.
Any such vertical surface on any hat or helmet.
Any such horizontal surface on any hat or helmet (called a peak in British English).
A device in an automobile that the driver or front passenger can lower over part of the windshield to block the sun (sun visor).

Modern era 
Some modern devices called visors are similar, for example:
Visor (ice hockey)

Types of modern transparent visors include:
The transparent or semi-transparent front part of a motorcycle crash helmet or police riotsquad helmets
Safety face shields used in construction, industry, or medical settings
An eyeshield to protect the eyes from sunlight on an American football helmet
A shield to protect the eyes from sunlight on a flight helmet or space suit
Green eyeshades, formerly worn by accountants and others engaged in vision-intensive, detail-oriented occupation.

See also
 Visard, a type of mask worn by fashionable women in the 16th and 17th centuries

References

Hats
Riot control equipment
Safety clothing